In mathematics, the Hurwitz zeta function is one of the many zeta functions.

The Hurwitz zeta function is named after Adolf Hurwitz, who introduced it in 1882.

Integral representation
The Hurwitz zeta function has an integral representation

The formula can be obtained, roughly, by writing

and then interchanging the sum and integral.

The integral representation above can be converted to a contour integral representation

where  is a Hankel contour counterclockwise around the positive real axis, and the principal branch is used for the complex exponentiation . Unlike the previous integral, this integral is valid for all s, and indeed is an entire function of s.

At , it has a simple pole with residue .

Hurwitz's formula
The Hurwitz zeta function satisfies an identity which generalizes the functional equation of the Riemann zeta function:

valid for Re(s) > 1 and 0 < a ≤ 1. The Riemann zeta functional equation is the special case a = 1:

Hurwitz's formula can also be expressed as

(for Re(s) < 0 and 0 < a ≤ 1).

Hurwitz's formula has a variety of different proofs. One proof uses the contour integration representation along with the residue theorem. A second proof uses a theta function identity, or equivalently Poisson summation. These proofs are analogous to the two proofs of the functional equation for the Riemann zeta function in Riemann's 1859 paper. Another proof of the Hurwitz formula uses Euler–Maclaurin summation to express the Hurwitz zeta function as an integral

(−1 < Re(s) < 0 and 0 < a ≤ 1) and then expanding the numerator as a Fourier series.

Functional equation for rational a
When a is a rational number, Hurwitz's formula leads to the following functional equation: For integers ,

holds for all values of s.

This functional equation can be written as another equivalent form:

.

Some finite sums
Closely related to the functional equation are the following finite sums, some of which may be evaluated in a closed form

where m is positive integer greater than 2 and s is complex, see e.g. Appendix B in.

Series representation
A convergent Newton series representation defined for (real) a > 0 and any complex s ≠ 1 was given by Helmut Hasse in 1930:

This series converges uniformly on compact subsets of the s-plane to an entire function.

where Δ is the forward difference operator. Thus, one may write:

Taylor series
The partial derivative of the zeta in the second argument is a shift:

Thus, the Taylor series can be written as:

Alternatively,

Closely related is the Stark–Keiper formula:

which holds for integer N and arbitrary s. See also Faulhaber's formula for a similar relation on finite sums of powers of integers.

Laurent series
The Laurent series expansion can be used to define generalized Stieltjes constants that occur in the series

In particular, the constant term is given by

As a special case, .

Discrete Fourier transform
The discrete Fourier transform of the Hurwitz zeta function with respect to the order s is the Legendre chi function.

Particular values

Negative integers
The values of ζ(s, a) at s = 0, −1, −2, ... are related to the Bernoulli polynomials:

For example, the  case gives

s-derivative
The partial derivative with respect to s at s = 0 is related to the Gamma function:

In particular,  The formula is due to Lerch.

Relation to Jacobi theta function
If  is the Jacobi theta function, then

For z=n an integer, this simplifies to

where ζ here is the Riemann zeta function. Note that this latter form is the functional equation for the Riemann zeta function, as originally given by Riemann.

Relation to Dirichlet L-functions
At rational arguments the Hurwitz zeta function may be expressed as a linear combination of Dirichlet L-functions and vice versa: The Hurwitz zeta function coincides with Riemann's zeta function ζ(s) when a = 1, when a = 1/2 it is equal to (2s−1)ζ(s), and if a = n/k with k > 2, (n,k) > 1 and 0 < n < k, then

the sum running over all Dirichlet characters mod k. In the opposite direction we have the linear combination

There is also the multiplication theorem

of which a useful generalization is the distribution relation

(This last form is valid whenever q a natural number and 1 − qa is not.)

Zeros
If a=1 the Hurwitz zeta function reduces to the Riemann zeta function itself; if a=1/2 it reduces to the Riemann zeta function multiplied by a simple function of the complex argument s (vide supra), leading in each case to the difficult study of the zeros of Riemann's zeta function. In particular, there will be no zeros with real part greater than or equal to 1. However, if 0<a<1 and a≠1/2, then there are zeros of Hurwitz's zeta function in the strip 1<Re(s)<1+ε for any positive real number ε. This was proved by Davenport and Heilbronn for rational or transcendental irrational a, and by Cassels for algebraic irrational a.

Rational values
The Hurwitz zeta function occurs in a number of striking identities at rational values. In particular, values in terms of the Euler polynomials :

and

One also has

and

For integer values of ν, these may be expressed in terms of the Euler polynomials.  These relations may be derived by employing the functional equation together with Hurwitz's formula, given above.

Applications
Hurwitz's zeta function occurs in a variety of disciplines. Most commonly, it occurs in number theory, where its theory is the deepest and most developed.  However, it also occurs in the study of fractals and dynamical systems. In applied statistics, it occurs in Zipf's law and the Zipf–Mandelbrot law. In particle physics, it occurs in a formula by Julian Schwinger, giving an exact result for the pair production rate of a Dirac electron in a uniform electric field.

Special cases and generalizations
The Hurwitz zeta function with a positive integer m is related to the polygamma function:

The Barnes zeta function generalizes the Hurwitz zeta function.

The Lerch transcendent generalizes the Hurwitz zeta:

and thus

Hypergeometric function

 where 

Meijer G-function

Notes

References

 See chapter 12 of 
 Milton Abramowitz and Irene A. Stegun, Handbook of Mathematical Functions, (1964) Dover Publications, New York. . (See Paragraph 6.4.10 for relationship to polygamma function.)

External links
 

Zeta and L-functions